Irish protests may refer to:

Current
 2022–2023 Irish transitional shelter protests, at emergency accommodation shelters across the country
 Anti-austerity protests in Ireland, continuing demonstrations in Ireland

Historic
 Blanket protest
 Dirty protest
 2008 protests after government budget delivery, including actions by farmers, pensioners and students
 2010 student protest in Dublin, the largest student protest for a generation
 March for a Better Way, held following admission of EU/ECB/IMF troika
 Vita Cortex sit-in, 2011-2012 action taken by workers in Cork

Occupy movement
 Occupy Cork
 Occupy Dame Street
 Occupy Galway

See also
 List of road protests in the UK and Ireland